Nurul Hanis Izmir (born 3 June 1985, in Penang, Malaysia) is a Malaysian economic reporter. She is a journalism graduate of the Universiti Sains Malaysia in Penang. Among her articles are "Boustead's share price falls despite Astacanggih buy" and "Azlan: Perlis negeri maju tahun 2015".

References

1985 births
Living people
Malaysian journalists
Malaysian women journalists
Malaysian people of Malay descent
Malaysian Muslims
People from Penang
Universiti Sains Malaysia alumni